Ragulin is a Slavic masculine surname, its feminine counterpart is Ragulina. Notable people with the surname include:

Alexander Ragulin (1941–2004), Soviet ice hockey player
Sergei Ragulin (born 1967), Russian football player

Russian-language surnames